Vădurele may refer to several villages in Romania:

 Vădurele, a village in Alexandru cel Bun Commune, Neamț County
 Vădurele, a village in Cândești Commune, Neamț County
 Vădurele, a village in Năpradea Commune, Sălaj County